The Myanmar Grand Royal Challenge Cup is a football tournament held in Myanmar. Club sides and national teams take part at the competition.

The competition was first held in 2005.

Champions

Teams' achievements
Below is the record of teams which participated at the Myanmar Grand Royal Challenge Cup.

 
International association football competitions hosted by Myanmar